Chan Hao-ching and Chan Yung-jan were the defending champions, but chose not to participate together. Chan Hao-ching played alongside Flavia Pennetta, but lost in the quarterfinals to Martina Hingis and Sania Mirza.
Chan Yung-jan teamed up with Zheng Jie, but lost to Caroline Garcia and Katarina Srebotnik in the final, 6–7(5–7), 2–6.

Seeds

Draw

Draw

External links
 Main draw

Aegon Internationalandnbsp;- Doubles
2015 Doubles